SBS M is a South Korean pay television music channel owned by SBS Medianet, a division of SBS Media Holdings. It features South Korean pop artists, international music, news, and a few reality and variety programs. 

It was launched in 2001 as the South Korean version of the US MTV. In 2011, it came under the SBS Paramount unit, a joint venture of SBS Medianet and Paramount Networks EMEAA and became SBS MTV. In June 2022, SBS and Paramount ceased their joint-venture, and the channel was renamed as SBS M. During its run as SBS MTV, it carried programs originally from the American MTV, along with a few Asian programs of its MTV Asian counterparts.

History

From 1994 to 1999, MTV, through a partnership deal, showed programs on the CheilJedang group's Mnet network.

In January 2001, the MTV block returned on OnGameNet, then owned by Orion Group's On-Media.

In July 2001, On-Media and Viacom launched MTV Korea.  Their partnership ended in 2008.

In 2008, MTV Korea was acquired by C&M.

In September 2011, SBS, a South Korean commercial broadcaster, became the official South Korean partner of Viacom (now re-merged with CBS Corporation to form ViacomCBS in 2019,now Paramount Global). With this, MTV became a part of SBS, and renamed SBS MTV in November 2011.

On June 30, 2022, the channel was renamed as SBS M with the departure of Paramount Global content to sister streaming service TVING, with the domestic version of Nickelodeon also rebranded as KiZmom.

Shows

Current programs 

 SBS Inkigayo
 The Show

Former programs 
 KSTAR News 840
 Running Man
 K-pop Star
 Channel Fiestar
 The Trot Show
 The Stage Big Pleasure
 KPOP Hero
 MTV Hits
 SBS MTV KPOP 20
 After Hours
 Wake Up Call
 BACK TO THE 90s
 HITS : Classic
 FRESH : POP
 FRESH : K-POP
 LIVE 4 U
 School Attack
Yogobara
 I GOT7
 Lovelyz in Wonderland 
 Hello, Daniel 
 Treasure Map

Current VJs
 Nara
 Supasize
 Semi
 Seorak
 Kewnsung
 Hongwook
 MC Rhymer
 Seunggwang
 Tim
 G-Ma$ta
 Jungmin
 Hanbyul
 Janet
 Joi
 Sara
 Bin
 Donemany
 Lee Eugene
 Yuri

See also
 MTV
 MTV Networks Asia Pacific
 MTV Southeast Asia
 Mnet (former partner of MTV in South Korea)
 MBC M

References

External links
  

MTV channels
MTV
Television channels in South Korea
Korean-language television stations
Music organizations based in South Korea
Television channels and stations established in 2001